Sigchos Canton is a canton of Ecuador, located in the Cotopaxi Province.  Its capital is the town of Sigchos.  Its population at the 2001 census was 20,722.

Demographics
Ethnic groups as of the Ecuadorian census of 2010:
Mestizo  52.7%
Indigenous  40.8%
Montubio  3.7%
White  2.0%
Afro-Ecuadorian  0.8%
Other  0.1%

References

Cantons of Cotopaxi Province